Osmar de la Cruz Molinas González (born 3 May 1987) is a Paraguayan footballer central midfielder who currently plays for Deportivo Capiatá.

Club career

Molinas started his career in the youth divisions of Olimpia and made his professional debut in 2006.

International career
Molinas also has been called to the Under-23 Paraguay national football team in several occasions.

References

External links
 Osmar Molinas at Football-Lineups
 
 

1985 births
Living people
People from Capiatá
Paraguayan footballers
Paraguayan expatriate footballers
Paraguay international footballers
Paraguayan Primera División players
Chilean Primera División players
Primera B de Chile players
Club Olimpia footballers
Colo-Colo footballers
Club Libertad footballers
Club Sol de América footballers
Independiente F.B.C. footballers
Deportivo Santaní players
Deportivo Capiatá players
Expatriate footballers in Chile
Paraguayan expatriate sportspeople in Chile
2015 Copa América players
Association football midfielders